The Mtshabezi River is a tributary of the Thuli River in southern Zimbabwe.

References 

Thuli River
Shashe River